ASK Arena, formerly Inter Arena and Shafa Stadium is an all-seater football stadium located in Baku . The stadium was built on the site of Termist stadium in 2001 and has a capacity of 8,125 spectators. The stadium surrounded by practice fields, administration buildings and four-star hotel.

Background
ASK Arena was built by AFFA in 2001. The first match played was a 2001–02 UEFA Cup first qualifying round between Shafa Baku and Olimija Ljubljana where the match ended 0–4. The first goal scored by Dušan Kosič.

The stadium was one of the venues for the group stages of the 2012 FIFA U-17 Women's World Cup. A Group A match were played there.

In July 2014, it was announced that stadium will change its name to Inter-Arena after Keşla FK (whose former name was "Inter Baku") loaned stadium for long-term from AFFA.

As the stadium changed its owner, in July 2018 it was renamed again into ASK Arena (which means Azerbaijan Industrial Corporation) for sponsorship reasons.

External links

 StadiumDB images

References

Football venues in Baku
Sports venues completed in 2001